Witless is a British thriller sitcom created by Lloyd Woolf and Joe Tucker, produced by Objective Fiction, part of Objective Media Group, for the BBC. The first episode of the first series was released on 22 April 2016 on BBC Three, with a new episode weekly. A second series was commissioned prior to the series finale to air in early 2017, with the full series released on 25 January 2017. A third series was commissioned on 23 February 2017, in a statement co-star Kerry Howard said she was "beyond thrilled that Witless has a third series". The full third series was released on 10 January 2018. Before it was released Howard confirmed on her Twitter page that this would be the final series.

Two young women, Rhona and Leanne (played by Zoe Boyle and Kerry Howard), who share a flat in Bristol, are later placed in witness protection after witnessing a murder. They are given new identities and moved to a flat in Swindon where they find their very recent past coming back to haunt them whilst they attempt to blend in with their surroundings.

Series overview

Cast 
 Kerry Howard as Leanne 
 Zoe Boyle as Rhona 
 Samuel Anderson as Patrick 
 Nicholas Fruin as Adrian "DJ Sound as Fuck"
 T'Nia Miller as DC Wilton 
 Nick Preston as Benny 
 Francis Magee as Willy Whelan (series 2–3) 
 Tim Faraday as One Pack (series 2–3) 
 Charlotte Eaton as Jackie (series 1–2)
 Tom Cawte as Appraisal (series 1, guest series 3) 
 John Hodgkinson as Sergeant Tony Forrest (series 1)
 Samuel Oatley as Ian (series 1)
 John Inverdale as himself (series 1, guest series 2–3)

Episodes

Series 1 (2016)

Series 2 (2017)

Series 3 (2018)

References

External links

2016 British television series debuts
2018 British television series endings
2010s British black comedy television series
2010s British sitcoms
BBC crime television shows
BBC television sitcoms
British crime comedy television series
Crime thriller television series
English-language television shows
Murder in television
Television shows set in Bristol
Television shows set in Wiltshire
Works about contract killers
Television series about witness protection